Montes de Toledo Comarca is a comarca located at the southern end of the province of Toledo, Spain. The natural comarca includes some municipal terms in Ciudad Real Province.

It is named after the Montes de Toledo mountain system. and, like other mountainous rural areas in central Spain, this comarca has been traditionally a place of cattle rearers, with some honey production as well. Nowadays the comarca has suffered heavy depopulation as the economy has diversified.

Municipal terms and villages

Municipal terms in Ciudad Real Province

 Alcoba
 Arroba de los Montes
 El Robledo
 Fontanarejo
 Fuente el Fresno
 Las Labores
 Los Cortijos
 Navalpino
 Navas de Estena
 Porzuna
 Puebla de Don Rodrigo
 Retuerta del Bullaque

References

External links 
Comarca de los Montes de Toledo - Caminos a Guadalupe

Geography of the Province of Toledo
Comarcas of Castilla–La Mancha
Montes de Toledo